Smicronyx fulvus, commonly known as the red sunflower seed weevil, is a weevil in the family Curculionidae.

Description
Adult beetles are 2.5–3 mm in length.
They are long and reddish-brown in color.

Distribution
The species is found in the United States and Canada.

Ecology
The larvae feed on Helianthus species and are sometimes parasitised by the braconid wasp Nealiolus curculionis.

References 

Curculioninae
Beetles of North America
Beetles described in 1876